Guarea cedrata, also called light bossé or scented guarea, is a species of plant in the family Meliaceae. It is found in Cameroon, the Republic of the Congo, the Democratic Republic of the Congo, Ivory Coast, Ghana, Liberia, Nigeria, Sierra Leone, and Uganda. It is threatened by habitat loss.

References

External links
 

cedrata
Vulnerable plants
Flora of Cameroon
Flora of the Republic of the Congo
Flora of the Democratic Republic of the Congo
Flora of Ivory Coast
Flora of Ghana
Flora of Liberia
Flora of Nigeria
Flora of Sierra Leone
Flora of Uganda
Taxonomy articles created by Polbot
Taxobox binomials not recognized by IUCN